Joculator albulus is a species of minute sea snails, marine gastropod molluscs in the family Cerithiopsidae. It was described by Thiele in 1930.

References

Gastropods described in 1930
albulus